Polish 1st Corps in the East can refer to:
 Polish I Corps in Russia during World War I
 Polish I Corps in the Soviet Union during World War II